Poplar Hill Generating Plant is a natural gas power station owned by Heartland Generation. The plant is located about 30 km northwest of Grande Prairie, Alberta, Canada. The plant operates in one of two modes as a synchronous condenser that allows the plant's generator to be disconnected from the turbine to provide voltage support or as a conventional power plant when additional power is needed in the region.

Description
The plant consists of:
 One GE LM6000 gas turbine and generator

References

Natural gas-fired power stations in Alberta
County of Grande Prairie No. 1